Fushëbardhë (also Fushë-Bardhë) is a small village in the south of Albania near Gjirokastër. It is part of the former municipality Cepo. At the 2015 local government reform it became part of the municipality Gjirokastër.

Notable people
Adil Çarçani (1922–1997) (former Prime Minister of Albania)

References

Populated places in Gjirokastër
Villages in Gjirokastër County

da:Ismail Kadaré